Imaginary Day is the ninth studio album by the Pat Metheny Group. It was released in 1997 by Warner Bros. Records. The album was strongly inspired by world music from Iran and Indonesia, and won the 1999 Grammy Award for Best Contemporary Jazz Album. The song "The Roots of Coincidence" won a Grammy Award for Best Rock Instrumental Performance; critic Richard Ginnell of AllMusic described the song as a dramatic departure for the group:  "[an] out-and-out rock piece with thrash metal and techno-pop episodes joined by abrupt jump cuts."

The album cover uses a simple pictographic Substitution cipher for the name of the group and the title of the album.

History
This album marks the final appearance of longtime drummer Paul Wertico, who would leave in 2001 before the recording of Speaking of Now to work on other projects.

Track listing

Personnel
 Pat Metheny – acoustic and electric guitars, guitar synthesizer, 42-string Pikasso guitar
 Lyle Mays – piano, keyboards
 Steve Rodby – acoustic and electric bass, cello
 Paul Wertico – drums
 David Blamires – vocals, guitar, trumpet, violin, mellophone, recorder
 Mark Ledford – vocals, flugelhorn, trumpet
 Dave Samuels – percussion
 Glen Velez – percussion
 Don Alias – percussion
 Mino Cinélu – percussion

Production
 Pat Metheny, Lyle Mays, Steve Rodby – producers
 Mastered by Ted Jensen at Sterling Sound, New York City

Certifications

Awards
Grammy Awards

See also
 Pikasso guitar

References

External links 
 Translated liner notes

Pat Metheny albums
1997 albums
Albums with cover art by Stefan Sagmeister
Warner Records albums
Grammy Award for Best Contemporary Jazz Album
Albums recorded at MSR Studios